Masten may refer to:

Places
Masten, Pennsylvania, USA; a ghost town
Masten Creek, a stream in Minnesota, USA

People
Chris Masten (born 1969) Aussie-rules player
Joseph G. Masten (1809–1871) Mayor of Buffalo, New York

Other uses
Masten Space Systems, an aerospace manufacturer
Masten-Quinn House in Wurtsboro, NY, USA

See also
 Mastens Corner, Delaware, USA; an unincorporated community in Kent County
 Masten Gregory (1932-1985) F1 racecar driver from the U.S.
 Peter Masten Dunne (1889-1957) U.S. historian